The University of Warsaw Library (BUW) is a library of the University of Warsaw, Poland.

History

The library was founded in 1816 as a direct consequence of establishing The Royal Warsaw University. Samuel Linde, a linguist, lexicographer, educator and librarian, became its first director. The library initially housed mostly theological and historical Books, the collection was however enlarged by papers from other scientific fields thanks to the right to receive Legal deposits obtained in 1819. In 1831 the library, which served as a public library at that time, already housed 134,000 volumes of books, stored in Kazimierzowski Palace. After the fall of the November uprising the same year, the institution had been closed, and most of the collection taken away by Russian authorities to Saint Petersburg. In 1862, the university was reinstated in Warsaw under the name of Main School and so was the library, which was renamed as the Main Library. The collection numbered 260,000 book volumes.

In 1871, Main School became the Imperial University of Warsaw and the Main Library fell under the control of that University. The collection was growing constantly, and a much needed new building was constructed in 1891–1894 at Krakowskie Przedmieście. The building was designed to fit one million volumes. Before the outbreak of World War I the collection had grown to 610,000 volumes. During the war some of the most precious books and Manuscripts were taken away to Rostov-on-Don by fleeing tsarist authorities. After the 1921 Treaty of Riga, most of the works were returned to Poland. At the outbreak of World War II, the library held about one million items. During the war part of the most precious collections, 14% or 130 000 volumes, was damaged by fire. Thanks to the dedicated librarians some of the library's resources survived the war after being walled-in in the basement.

After the war the library focused mainly on recovering its collections and acquiring new ones from abandoned properties of Germans and Polish nobility. During the first five post-war years, the library's collection increased by 350 thousand volumes and remained the largest academic library in Poland. Unfortunately communist authorities’ deliberate reduction of funds for the university has automatically caused significant limitations in extending the library's resources. Until the end of 1990s the library's poor accommodation situation corresponded with the difficulties in collecting, organising and circulating its collections.

During the 1980s the library was one of the prominent centres of free thought and activism. The members of anti-communist resistance, including the famous Solidarność movement, were frequent guests to the library.

In the 1990s a selection procedure for a new building was initiated. A design by architects Marek Budzyński and Zbigniew Badowski was chosen, and the new library building was opened on 15 December 1999. Six months before, on 11 June 1999, the building was blessed by Pope John Paul II. On 15 June 2001 president of the United States, George W. Bush gave a speech in the new library building to the university community and the residents of Warsaw.

Present Day

Collection 
As of 2019, there were 6,236,619 items at the University of Warsaw Library and 40 faculty libraries of the University of Warsaw. The collection of the University Library itself consists of 3,393,209 items, including 2,200,073 non-serial publications, 782,064 periodicals and 407,511 items from special collections. The number of BUW readers in 2019 was 112,826.

The library has the right to receive legal deposits.

Crispa 
In 2007 the University of Warsaw established its own electronic library. The resources available online mostly consist of public domain materials and publications for which the university was granted license by the right holders. Until 2019 the electronic library operated under a short name "e-bUW". In September 2019 a new version was launched and since then the library is officially called Crispa.

BuwLOG – the library's blog 
In the years 1996–2013, over 200 issues of the "BUW Bulletin" - a periodical describing important moments in the life of the library were published. Until November 2010 the Bulletin was issued in paper and electronic form. Since December 2010 the Bulletin is issued only in electronic form. Since March 2014, librarians describe the library's reality, discuss and share their professional experience, and publish their own works at BuwLOG.

BUW for owls 
BUW for owls (pol. BUW dla sów) is a special event taking place at the University of Warsaw Library. During the exam sessions the library stays open until 5 am so the students can come to study during the night hours. For the first time, BUW for owls took place before the winter session in 2010. The library remained open until morning for two weeks, except for the weekends. The event was enthusiastically received by the students and takes place regularly: twice a year before the winter and summer examination sessions.

Self-service mode 
In 2019, for the first time, the library was open without the librarians on site, in a so-called self-service mode. The change in the operating mode was a direct result of the evident demand of the university community for extended opening hours of the library during the summer months.

BiblioWawa – Warsaw Reciprocal Borrowing Programme 
BUW participates in a joint project of 7 Warsaw academic libraries, which provides the Warsaw academic community with convenient access to circulating library resources of the cooperating libraries. Warsaw Reciprocal Borrowing Programme was launched on December 18, 2017. Apart from BUW, the project is co-created by the following libraries of Warsaw's universities: Maria Grzegorzewska University, Józef Piłsudski University of Physical Education in Warsaw, Warsaw University of Technology, Cardinal Stefan Wyszyński University in Warsaw, Medical University of Warsaw, Military University of Technology.

BUW among international associations and organizations 
University of Warsaw Library is a member of the following associations and organizations:

 AANLA – Association des Amis des Nouvelles du Livre Ancien;
 CERL – Consortium of European Research Libraries;
 IAC – International Advisory Committee of Keepers of Public Collection of Graphic Art;
 IAML – International Association of Music Libraries;
 ICAM – International Confederation of Architectural Museums;
 IFLA – International Federation of Library Associations and Institutions;
 LIBER – Ligue des Bibliothèques Europeennes de Recherche;
 OCLC – Online Computer Library Center Global Council, EMEA Regional Council.

University gardens and architecture

The distinct new building includes a botanical garden, located on the roof. The garden designed by landscape architect Irena Bajerska, has an area of one hectare, and is one of the largest roof gardens in Europe.

It is freely accessible not only to the academia, but also to the public.

The upper part of the garden consists of four parts: the Golden Garden (to the north), the Silver Garden (to the east), the Crimson Garden (to the south) and the Green Garden (to the west). It is available from April to October while from 1 November to 31 March only the Lower Garden is open.

The main facade on the Dobra Street side contains large blocks of classical texts in various scripts, including the Old Polish text of Jan Kochanowski, Classical Greek text by Plato and Hebrew script from the Book of Ezekiel.

In 2004, Kyoei Steel company donated a traditional tea pavilion, Chashitsu to the Department of Japanese and Korean Studies of the Faculty of Oriental Studies at the University of Warsaw. It was placed on level 2 of the University Library. The pavilion designed by Teruhito Iijima and its surroundings were built of natural materials (wood, bamboo, paper, clay, stone). Various events take place in the Chashitsu: university classes devoted to Japanese tea culture, presentations and open chanoyu workshops, for example during the Japanese Days at the University of Warsaw. The pavilion is the only original example of traditional Japanese architecture in Poland.

References

External links 

 Official website
 Crispa Electronic Library of University of Warsaw

Academic libraries in Poland
Buildings and structures in Warsaw
Library buildings completed in 1999
University of Warsaw
1816 establishments in the Russian Empire
Libraries in Warsaw
Parks in Warsaw
Botanical gardens in Poland